South Lakeland is a local government district in Cumbria, England. The population of the non-metropolitan district was 102,301 according to the 2001 census, increasing to 103,658 at the 2011 Census. Its council is based in Kendal.  It includes much of the Lake District as well as northwestern parts of the Yorkshire Dales.

The district was created on 1 April 1974 under the Local Government Act 1972.   It was formed from the Kendal borough, Windermere urban district, most of Lakes urban district, South Westmorland Rural District, from Westmorland, Grange and Ulverston urban districts and North Lonsdale Rural District from Lancashire, and Sedbergh Rural District from the West Riding of Yorkshire.

In July 2021 the Ministry of Housing, Communities and Local Government announced that in April 2023, Cumbria will be reorganised into two unitary authorities.  South Lakeland District Council is to be abolished and its functions transferred to a new authority, to be known as Westmorland and Furness, which will cover the current districts of Barrow-in-Furness, Eden and South Lakeland.

Governance

Elections to the district council are held in three out of every four years, with one third of the 51 seats on the council being elected at each election. No political party held a majority on the council from the first election in 1973 to 2006. However, after winning a majority at the 2006 election the Liberal Democrats controlled the council. As of a set of by-elections in 2021 the council is composed of the following councillors:-

The council was fined £120,000 in February 2015 after two women were killed in separate incidents by reversing rubbish lorries. An investigation by the Health and Safety Executive found they had failed to tackle the risks from reversing vehicles.

Map

References

External links
South Lakeland District Councillors
Lakeland Walks
Explore South Lakeland

 
Furness
Non-metropolitan districts of Cumbria